Ranqueles mus is a species of beetle in the family Cerambycidae. It was described by Pierre-Émile Gounelle in 1906. It is known from central and northwestern Argentina. It feeds on Prosopis nigra.

References

Bothriospilini
Beetles of South America
Beetles described in 1906